

Rg-Rh  

RGM-CSF
Rheaban
Rheomacrodex
Rheumatrex
Rhinalar
Rhinall Nasal
Rhinatate
Rhindecon
Rhinocort
Rhinolar
Rhinosyn
Rhodacine
Rhodis
Rhogam
Rhotral
Rhotrimine
Rhuli Cream
Rhulicaine

Ri

Rib-Rid  

Ribaminol (INN)
Ribasphere
Ribavirin (INN)
Riboflavin (INN)
Riboprine (INN)
Ribostamycin (INN)
Ricasetron (INN)
Rid Mousse
Ridaforolimus (USAN, INN)
Ridaura
Ridazolol (INN)
Ridogrel (INN)

Rif-Ril  

Rifabutin (INN)
Rifadin
Rifalazil (INN)
Rifamate
Rifametane (INN)
Rifamexil (INN)
Rifamide (INN)
Rifampicin (INN)
Rifampin (INN)
Rifamycin (INN)
Rifapentine (INN)
Rifater
Rifaximin (INN)
Riferminogene pecaplasmid (INN)
Rilapine (INN)
Rilapladib (USAN)
Rilmakalim (INN)
Rilmazafone (INN)
Rilmenidine (INN)
Rilonacept (USAN)
Rilopirox (INN)
Rilotumumab (USAN, INN)
Rilozarone (INN)
Rilpirivine (USAN)
Rilutek (Sanofi-Aventis). Redirects to riluzole.
Riluzole (INN)

Rim-Rip  

Rimactane
Rimadyl
Rimantadine (INN)
Rimazolium metilsulfate (INN)
Rimcazole (INN)
Rimexolone (INN)
Rimifon
Rimiterol (INN)
Rimonabant (USAN)
Rimoprogin (INN)
Rimso-50
Rindopepimut (USAN)
Rinfabate (USAN)
Rintatolimod (USAN, INN)
Ringer's
Riobin
Riociguat (USAN)
Riodipine (INN)
Riomet
Riopan
Rioprostil (INN)
Ripazepam (INN)
Ripisartan (INN)

Ris-Riz  

Risedronic acid (INN)
Rismorelin (INN)
Risocaine (INN)
Risotilide (INN)
Rispenzepine (INN)
Risperdal
Risperidone (INN)
Ristianol (INN)
Ristocetin (INN)
Ritalin
Ritanserin (INN)
Ritiometan (INN)
Ritipenem (INN)
Ritodrine (INN)
Ritolukast (INN)
Ritonavir (INN)
Ritropirronium bromide (INN)
Ritrosulfan (INN)
Rituxan (Genentech, Inc) 
Rituximab (INN)
Rivanase AQ
Rivanicline (USAN, (INN))
Rivaroxaban (USAN)
Rivasol
Rivastigmine (INN)
Rivenprost (INN)
Rizatriptan (INN)
Rizolipase (INN)

Ro

Roa-Rod  

Roaccutane (Roche). Redirects to isotretinoin.
Robalzotan (INN)
Robatumumab (USAN), (INN)
Robaxin
Robaxisal
Robengatope
Robenidine (INN)
Robimycin
Robinul
Robitet
Robitussin
Rocaltrol
Rocastine (INN)
Rocepafant (INN)
Rocephin
Rociclovir (INN)
Rociverine (INN)
Rocuronium bromide (INN)
Rodocaine (INN)
Rodorubicin (INN)

Rof-Rom  

Rofact
Rofecoxib (INN)
Rofelodine (INN)
Roferon-A (Hoffmann-La Roche Inc) 
Rofleponide (INN)
Roflufocon A (USAN)
Roflufocon B (USAN)
Roflufocon C (USAN)
Roflufocon D (USAN)
Roflufocon E (USAN)
Roflumilast (INN)
Roflurane (INN)
Rogaine
Rogletimide (INN)
Rokitamycin (INN)
Rolafagrel (INN)
Rolaids
Rolapitant (USAN)
Roledumab (INN)
Roletamide (INN)
Rolgamidine (INN)
Rolicyclidine (INN)
Rolicyprine (INN)
Rolipoltide (INN)
Rolipram (INN)
Rolitetracycline (INN)
Rolodine (INN)
Rolofylline (USAN)
Rolziracetam (INN)
Romazarit (INN)
Romazicon
Romergoline (INN)
Romidepsin (USAN)
Romifenone (INN)
Romifidine (INN)
Romilar AC
Romiplostim (USAN)
Romosozumab (USAN)
Romurtide (INN)
Romycin

Ron-Row  

Ronacaleret (USAN)
Ronactolol (INN)
Rondomycin
Ronidazole (INN)
Ronifibrate (INN)
Ronipamil (INN)
Ronomilast (INN)
Rontalizumab (USAN, INN)
Ropidoxuridine (USAN)
Ropinirole (INN)
Ropitoin (INN)
Ropivacaine (INN)
Ropizine (INN)
Roquinimex (INN)
Rosabulin (USAN)
Rosanil
Rosaprostol (INN)
Rosaramicin (INN)
Rose bengal (131 I) sodium (INN)
Rosiglitazone (INN)
Rosoxacin (INN)
Rosterolone (INN)
Rosula
Rosuvastatin (USAN)
Rotamicillin (INN)
Rotigaptide (USAN)
Rotigotine (USAN)
Rotoxamine (INN)
Rotraxate (INN)
Rovamycine
Rovelizumab (INN)
Rowasa

Rox-Roz  

Roxadimate (INN)
Roxanol
Roxarsone (INN)
Roxatidine (INN)
Roxibolone (INN)
Roxicet
Roxicodone
Roxifiban (INN)
Roxilox
Roxindole (INN)
Roxiprin
Roxithromycin (INN)
Roxolonium metilsulfate (INN)
Roxoperone (INN)
Rozrolimupab (USAN)

Rs-Ry  

RS-25259
RTCA
Ru-Vert-M
Rubex
Rubidomycin (INN)
Rubitecan (INN)
Ruboxistaurin (INN)
Rubivite
Rubramin PC
Rubratope
Rucaparib (INN)
Rufen
Rufinamide (INN)
Rufloxacin (INN)
Rufocromomycin (INN)
Rum-K
Rupatadine (INN)
Rupintrivir (USAN)
Ruplizumab (INN)
Rusalactide (USAN)
Rutamycin (INN)
Rutoside (INN)
Ruvazone (INN)
Ruvite
Ruxolitinib (USAN, INN)
Ruzadolane (INN)
Rymed
Ryna
Rynatan
Rynatuss
Rythmodan
Rythmol